The circumflex is a diacritic in the Latin and Greek scripts that is also used in the written forms of many languages and in various romanization and transcription schemes.

The circumflex in the Latin script is chevron-shaped, while the Greek circumflex may be displayed either like a tilde or like an inverted breve. For the most commonly encountered uses of the accent in the Latin alphabet, precomposed characters are available.

In English, the circumflex, like other diacritics, is sometimes retained on loanwords that used it in the original language (for example, crème brûlée).
In mathematics and statistics, the circumflex diacritic is sometimes used to denote a function and is called a hat operator.

A free-standing version of the circumflex symbol, has become known as caret and has acquired special uses, particularly in computing and mathematics. The original caret, is used in proofreading to indicate insertion.

Uses

Diacritic on vowels

Pitch

The circumflex has its origins in the polytonic orthography of Ancient Greek, where it marked long vowels that were pronounced with high and then falling pitch. In a similar vein, the circumflex is today used to mark tone contour in the International Phonetic Alphabet. This is also how it is used in Bamanankan (as opposed to a háček, which signifies a rising tone on a syllable).

The shape of the circumflex was originally a combination of the acute and grave accents (^), as it marked a syllable contracted from two vowels: an acute-accented vowel and a non-accented vowel (all non-accented syllables in Ancient Greek were once marked with a grave accent). Later a variant similar to the tilde (~) was also used.

The term "circumflex" is also used to describe similar tonal accents that result from combining two vowels in related languages such  as Sanskrit and Latin.

Since Modern Greek has a stress accent instead of a pitch accent, the circumflex has been replaced with an acute accent in the modern monotonic orthography.

Length 
The circumflex accent marks a long vowel in the orthography or transliteration of several languages.

Examples of circumflex use in Afrikaans are sê "to say", wêreld "world", môre "tomorrow", brûe "bridges".
 Akkadian. In the transliteration of this language, the circumflex indicates a long vowel resulting from an aleph contraction.
 In western Cree, Sauk, and Saulteaux, the Algonquianist Standard Roman Orthography (SRO) indicates long vowels  either with a circumflex ⟨â ê î ô⟩ or with a macron ⟨ā ē ī ō⟩.
 The PDA orthography for Domari uses circumflex-bearing vowels for length.
 In Emilian, â î û are used to represent 
 French. In some varieties, such as in Belgian French, Swiss French and Acadian French, vowels with a circumflex are long: fête  (party) is longer than faite . This length compensates for a deleted consonant, usually s.
 Standard Friulian.
 Japanese. In the Nihon-shiki system of romanization, the circumflex is used to indicate long vowels. The Kunrei-shiki system, which is based on Nihon-shiki system, also uses the circumflex. The Traditional and Modified forms of the Hepburn system use the macron for this purpose, though some users may use the circumflex as a substitute if there are difficulties inputting the macron, as the two diacritics are visually similar.
 Jèrriais.
There are also additional vowels which are diphthongs such as aô , âu , âm , ŏâm  and aôh .
 In Kurmanji Kurdish, ⟨ê î û⟩ are used to represent .
 In Mikasuki, circumflexed vowels indicate a rising and falling pitch or tone.
 In Adûnaic, the Black Speech, and Khuzdul, constructed languages of J. R. R. Tolkien, all long vowels are transcribed with the circumflex. In Sindarin, another of Tolkien's languages, long vowels in polysyllabic words take the acute, but a circumflex in monosyllables, to mark a non-phonemic extra lengthening.

Stress 

The circumflex accent marks the stressed vowel of a word in some languages:
 Portuguese â, ê, and ô are stressed "closed" vowels, opposed to their open counterparts á, é, and ó (see below).
 Welsh: the circumflex, due to its function as a disambiguating lengthening sign (see above), is used in polysyllabic words with word-final long vowels. The circumflex thus indicates the stressed syllable (which would normally be on the penultimate syllable), since in Welsh, non-stressed vowels may not normally be long. This happens notably where the singular ends in an a,  to, e.g. singular camera, drama, opera, sinema → plural camerâu, dramâu, operâu, sinemâu; however, it also occurs in singular nominal forms, e.g. arwyddocâd; in verbal forms, e.g. deffrônt, cryffânt; etc.

Vowel quality 
In Breton, it is used on an e to show that the letter is pronounced open instead of closed.
 In Bulgarian, the sound represented in Bulgarian by the Cyrillic letter ъ (er goljam) is usually transliterated as â in systems used prior to 1989. Although called a schwa (misleadingly suggesting an unstressed lax sound), it is more accurately described as a mid back unrounded vowel . Unlike English or French, but similar to Romanian and Afrikaans, it can be stressed.
 In Pinyin romanized Mandarin Chinese, ê is used to represent the sound  in isolation, which occurs sometimes as an exclamation.
 In French, the letter ê is normally pronounced open, like è. In the usual pronunciations of central and northern France, ô is pronounced close, like eau; in Southern France, no distinction is made between close and open o.
 Portuguese â , ê , and ô  are stressed high vowels, in opposition to á , é , and ó , which are stressed low vowels.
 In Romanian, the circumflex is used on the vowels â and î to mark the vowel , similar to Russian yery. The names of these accented letters are â din a and î din i, respectively. (The letter â only appears in the middle of words; thus, its majuscule version appears only in all-capitals inscriptions.)
 In Slovak, the circumflex (vokáň) on ô indicates a diphthong .
The circumflex can appear together with a tone mark on the same vowel, as in the word Việt. Vowels with circumflex are considered separate letters from the base vowels.

Nasality
 In Luxembourgish m̂ n̂ can be used to indicate nasalisation of a vowel. Also, the circumflex can be over the vowel to indicate nasalisation. In either case, the circumflex is rare.
Due to typographical shortage of characters, some nasal vowels in Xârâcùù are encoded with an umlaut: e.g. ä , ü ).

Other articulatory features
 In Emilian, ê ô  denote both length and height. In Romagnol, they are used to represent the diphthongs , whose specific articulation varies between dialects, e.g. sêl  "salt".
 In Philippine languages, the circumflex (pakupyâ) is used to represent the simultaneous occurrence of a stress and a glottal stop in the last vowel of the word.
 In Old Tupi, the circumflex changed a vowel into a semivowel: î , û , and ŷ .
In Rusyn, the letter ŷ  is sometimes used to transliterate the Cyrillic ы.
The circumflex over i is used to indicate a nisba suffix (millî, dinî).

Visual discrimination between homographs
 In Serbo-Croatian the circumflex can be used to distinguish homographs, and it is called the "genitive sign" or "length sign". Examples include sam "am" versus sâm "alone". For example, the phrase "I am alone" may be written Ja sam sâm to improve clarity. Another example: da "yes", dâ "gives".
 Turkish. According to Turkish Language Association orthography, düzeltme işareti "correction mark" over a, i and u marks a long vowel to disambiguate similar words. For example, compare ama "but" and âmâ "blind", şura 'that place, there' and şûra "council". In general, circumflexes occur only in Arabic and Persian loanwords as vowel length in early Turkish was not phonemic. However, this standard was never applied entirely consistently and by the late 20th century many publications had stopped using circumflexes almost entirely. 
 Welsh. The circumflex is known as hirnod "long sign" or acen grom "crooked accent", but more usually and colloquially as to bach "little roof". It lengthens a stressed vowel (a, e, i, o, u, w, y), and is used particularly to differentiate between homographs; e.g. tan and tân, ffon and ffôn, gem and gêm, cyn and cŷn, or gwn and gŵn. However the circumflex is only required on elongated vowels if the same word exists without the circumflex - "nos" (night), for example, has an elongated "o" sound but a circumflex is not required as the same word with a shortened "o" doesn't exist.
 The orthography of French has a few pairs of homophones that are only distinguished by the circumflex: e.g. du  (partitive article) vs. dû  'due'.

Diacritic on consonants
 In Pinyin, the romanized writing of Mandarin Chinese, ẑ, ĉ, and ŝ are, albeit rarely, used to represent zh , ch , and sh , respectively.
 In Esperanto, the circumflex is used on ĉ , ĝ , ĥ , ĵ , ŝ . Each indicates a different consonant from the unaccented form, and is considered a separate letter for purposes of collation. (See Esperanto orthography.)
 In Nsenga, ŵ denotes the labiodental approximant .
 In Chichewa, ŵ (present for example in the name of the country Malaŵi) used to denote the voiced bilabial fricative ; nowadays, however, most Chichewa-speakers pronounce it as a regular .
 In Nias, ŵ denotes the semivowel .
 In the African language Venda, a circumflex below d, l, n, and t is used to represent dental consonants: ḓ, ḽ, ṋ, ṱ.
This usage was quickly abandoned during the same century, once the RAE decided to use ch and x with one assigned pronunciation only:  and  respectively.
It is also used above vowels to indicate length.

Abbreviation, contraction, and disambiguation

English 
In 18th century British English, before the cheap Penny Post and while paper was taxed, the combination ough was occasionally shortened to ô when the gh was not pronounced, to save space: thô for though, thorô for thorough, and brôt for brought.

French 

In French, the circumflex generally marks the former presence of a consonant (usually s) that was deleted and is no longer pronounced. (The corresponding Norman French words, and consequently the words derived from them in English, frequently retain the lost consonant.) For example:
ancêtre "ancestor"
hôpital "hospital"
hôtel "hostel"
forêt "forest"
rôtir "to roast"
côte "rib, coast, slope"
pâté "paste"
août "August"
dépôt (from the Latin depositum 'deposit', but now referring to both a deposit or a storehouse of any kind)

Some homophones (or near-homophones in some varieties of French) are distinguished by the circumflex. However, â, ê and ô distinguish different sounds in most varieties of French, for instance cote  "level, mark, code number" and côte  "rib, coast, hillside".

In handwritten French, for example in taking notes, an m with a circumflex (m̂) is an informal abbreviation for même "same".

In February 2016, the Académie française decided to remove the circumflex from about 2,000 words, a plan that had been outlined since 1990. However, usage of the circumflex would not be considered incorrect.

Italian 
In Italian, î is occasionally used in the plural of nouns and adjectives ending with -io  as a crasis mark. Other possible spellings are -ii and obsolete -j or -ij. The plural forms of   "prince" and of   "principle, beginning" can be confusing. In pronunciation, they are distinguished by whether the stress is on the first or on the second syllable, but  would be a correct spelling of both.

Latin 

In New Latin, circumflex was used most often to disambiguate between forms of the same word that used a long vowel, for example ablative of first declension and genitive of fourth declension, or between second and third conjugation verbs. It was also used for the interjection ô.

Norwegian 
In Norwegian, the circumflex differentiates fôr "lining, fodder" from the preposition for. From a historical point of view, the circumflex also indicates that the word used to be spelled with the letter ð in Old Norsefor example, fôr is derived from  fóðr, lêr 'leather' from leðr, and vêr "weather, ram" from veðr (both lêr and vêr only occur in the Nynorsk spelling; in Bokmål these words are spelled lær and vær). After the ð disappeared, it was replaced by a d (fodr, vedr).

Portuguese 
Circumflexes are used in many common words of the language, such as você (you/thou), ânimo (cheer), and avô (grandfather). In early literacy classes in school, it is commonly nicknamed chapéu ("hat").

Mathematics

In mathematics, the circumflex is used to modify variable names; it is usually read "hat", e.g., î is "i hat".

In geometry, a hat is sometimes used for an angle.

In vector notation, a hat above a letter indicates a unit vector (a dimensionless vector with a magnitude of 1). For instance, or  stands for a unit vector in the direction of the x-axis of a Cartesian coordinate system.

In statistics, the hat is used to denote an estimator or an estimated value, as opposed to its theoretical counterpart. For example, in errors and residuals, the hat in  indicates an observable estimate (the residual) of an unobservable quantity called  (the statistical error). It is read x-hat or x-roof, where x represents the character under the hat.

Music

In music theory and musicology, a circumflex above a numeral is used to make reference to a particular scale degree.

In music notation, a chevron-shaped symbol placed above a note indicates marcato, a special form of emphasis or accent. In music for string instruments, a narrow inverted chevron indicates that a note should be performed up-bow.

Letters with circumflex

Circumflex in digital character sets 

The precomposed characters Â/â, Ê/ê, Î/î, Ô/ô, and Û/û (which incorporate the circumflex) are included in the ISO-8859-1 character set, and dozens more are available in Unicode.

Freestanding circumflex 

For historical reasons, there is a similar but larger character,  (&Hat; in HTML5), which is also included in ASCII but often called a caret instead (though this term has a long-standing meaning as a proofreader's mark, with its own codepoints in Unicode). It is, however, unsuitable for use as a diacritic on modern computer systems, as it is a spacing character.

Typing the circumflex accent

In countries where the local language(s) routinely include letters with a circumflex, local keyboards are typically engraved with those symbols.

For users with American or British QWERTY keyboards, the characters â, ĉ, ê, ĝ, ĥ, î, ĵ, ô, ŝ, û, ẃ, ý (and their uppercase equivalents) may be obtained after installing the International or extended keyboard layout setting. Then, by using (US Int)  or (UK Ext)  (^), then release, then the base letter, produces the accented version. (With this keyboard mapping,  or  becomes a dead key that applies the diacritic to the subsequent letter, if such a precomposed character exists. For example,  produces  as used in Welsh.) Alternatively for systems with a 'compose' function, etc. may be used.

Other methods are available: see Unicode input.

See also 
 Caret (disambiguation)
 Caron
 Circumflex in French
 Macron (diacritic)
 Tilde
 Turned v

References

External links 

 Diacritics Project"All you need to design a font with correct accents"
 Diacs and Quirks in a NutshellAfrikaans spelling explained
 Keyboard HelpLearn how to create world language accent marks and other diacritics on a computer

Latin-script diacritics
Greek-script diacritics